Reshma is a former Soviet air base in Russia located  east of Kineshma.  It is abandoned and little trace remains.

References
RussianAirFields.com

Soviet Air Force bases